Leonie Swann (born 1975 Dachau near Munich, Germany) is the pen name of a German crime writer. She studied philosophy, psychology and English literature in Munich, and now lives in Berlin.

Work
Her first novel, Glennkill (published as Three Bags Full in English), sold over 100,000 copies in the first six months after publication. It has been translated to 32 languages.
Her second novel, Garou, a sequel to Glennkill, is not a detective novel but a thriller.

Awards 
 2006 - German Friedrich Glauser crime writing prize, "debut" category.
 2006 - The Glennkill Cover came first in the Bloody Cover 2006 Awards.
 2007 - German Buchliebling for the CD.

Works 
 Three Bags Full, Doubleday 2006, 
 Garou. Ein Schaf-Thriller, Goldmann, Munich 2010, . (Original German edition, English translation not yet available)
 Dunkelsprung: Vielleicht kein Märchen, Goldmann, Munich 2014, . (Original German edition, English translation not yet available)
 Gray, Goldmann, Munich 2017, . (Original German edition, English translation not yet available)

 Mord in Sunset Hall, Goldmann, Munich 2020, . (Original German edition, English translation not yet available)

References

1975 births
Living people
Pseudonymous women writers
21st-century pseudonymous writers
21st-century German novelists
21st-century German women writers
German women novelists
German crime fiction writers
Women crime fiction writers